This article lists the squads for the 2023 SheBelieves Cup, the 8th edition of the SheBelieves Cup. The cup consisted of a series of friendly games, and will be held in the United States from 16 to 22 February 2023. The four national teams involved in the tournament registered a squad of 23 players.

The age listed for each player is on 16 February 2023, the first day of the tournament. The number of caps and goals listed for each player excludes any matches played after the tournament began. The club listed is the club for which the player last played a competitive match prior to the tournament. The nationality for each club reflects the national association (not the league) to which the club is affiliated. A flag is included for coaches that are of a different nationality than their own national team.

Squads

Brazil
Coach:  Pia Sundhage

The final 23-player squad was announced on 31 January 2023.

Canada
Coach:  Bev Priestman

A preliminary squad was announced on 1 February 2023. The final 23-player squad was announced on 13 February 2023.

Japan
Coach: Futoshi Ikeda

The final 23-player squad was announced on 8 February 2023. On 16 February 2023, Miyabi Moriya withdrew due to injury and was replaced by Shu Ohba.

United States
Coach:  Vlatko Andonovski

The final 23-player squad was announced on 1 February 2023.

Player representation

By club
Clubs with 3 or more players represented are listed.

By club nationality

By club federation

By representatives of domestic league

References

2023